This is a List of United States weather reconnaissance squadrons- USAAF -USAF.

See also
 List of United States Air Force squadrons

References

Weather reconnaissance